Eurhodope confusella is a species of snout moth in the genus Eurhodope. It was described by Francis Walker in 1866. It is found in South Africa.

References

Endemic moths of South Africa
Moths described in 1866
Phycitini